Building Societies Act is a stock short title used in both Ireland and the United Kingdom for legislation relating to building societies.

List

Ireland
The Building Societies (Amendment) Act 2006
The Building Societies Act 1989
The Building Societies (Amendment) Act 1986
The Building Societies (Amendment) Act 1983
The Building Societies (Amendment) Act 1980
The Building Societies Act 1976
The Building Societies Act 1974
The Building Societies Act 1942

United Kingdom
The Dormant Bank and Building Society Accounts Act 2008 (c 31)  
The Building Societies (Funding) and Mutual Societies (Transfers) Act 2007 (c 26)
The Building Societies (Distributions) Act 1997 (c 41)  
The Building Societies Act 1997 (c 32)  
The Building Societies (Joint Account Holders) Act 1995 (c 5) 
The Building Societies Act 1986 (c 53)
The Building Societies Act 1962 (10 & 11 Eliz 2 c 37)
The Building Societies Act 1960 (8 & 9 Eliz 2 c 64)
The Building Societies Act (Northern Ireland) 1967 (c 31) (NI)

The Building Societies Acts 1874 to 1894 was the collective title of the following Acts:
The Building Societies Act 1874 (37 & 38 Vict c 42)
The Building Societies Act 1875 (38 & 39 Vict c 9)
The Building Societies Act 1877 (40 & 41 Vict c 63)
The Building Societies Act 1884 (47 & 48 Vict c 41)
The Building Societies Act 1894 (57 & 58 Vict c 47)

See also
List of short titles

References

Lists of legislation by short title